The Last of Us is a 2013 action-adventure game developed by Naughty Dog and published by Sony Computer Entertainment. Players control Joel, a smuggler tasked with escorting a teenage girl, Ellie, across a post-apocalyptic United States. The Last of Us is played from a third-person perspective. Players use firearms and improvised weapons and can use stealth to defend against hostile humans and cannibalistic creatures infected by a mutated fungus. In the online multiplayer mode, up to eight players engage in cooperative and competitive gameplay.

Development of The Last of Us began in 2009, soon after the release of Naughty Dog's previous game, Uncharted 2: Among Thieves. For the first time in the company's history, Naughty Dog split into two teams; while one team developed Uncharted 3: Drake's Deception, the other half developed The Last of Us. The relationship between Joel and Ellie became the focus, with all other elements developed around it. Actors Troy Baker and Ashley Johnson portrayed Joel and Ellie, respectively, through voice and motion capture, and assisted creative director Neil Druckmann with the development of the characters and story. The original score was composed and performed by Gustavo Santaolalla.

Following its announcement in December 2011, The Last of Us was widely anticipated. It was released for the PlayStation 3 in June 2013. It received critical acclaim, with praise for its narrative, gameplay, visuals, sound design, score, characterization, and depiction of female characters. The Last of Us became one of the best-selling video games, selling over 1.3 million units in its first week and 17 million by April 2018. The game won year-end accolades, including multiple Game of the Year awards, from several gaming publications, critics, and game award ceremonies. It has been cited as one of the greatest video games ever made.

Naughty Dog released several downloadable content additions; The Last of Us: Left Behind adds a single-player campaign following Ellie and her best friend, Riley. A remastered version, The Last of Us Remastered, was released for the PlayStation 4 in July 2014, and a remake, The Last of Us Part I, was released in September 2022. A sequel, The Last of Us Part II, was released in 2020. Other Last of Us media includes a comic book in 2013, a live show in 2014, a television adaptation by HBO in 2023, a tabletop game by Themeborne in 2023, an untitled multiplayer game and an upcoming tabletop game by CMON.

Gameplay 
The Last of Us is an action-adventure game played from a third-person perspective. The player traverses post-apocalyptic environments such as towns, buildings, forests, and sewers to advance the story. The player can use firearms, improvised weapons, hand-to-hand combat, and stealth to defend against hostile humans and cannibalistic creatures infected by a mutated strain of the Cordyceps fungus. For most of the game, the player takes control of Joel, a man tasked with escorting a young girl, Ellie, across the United States. The player also controls Ellie throughout the game's winter segment and briefly controls Joel's daughter, Sarah, in the opening sequence.

In combat, the player can use long-range weapons, such as a rifle, a shotgun, and a bow, and short-range weapons such as a handgun and a short-barreled shotgun. The player is able to scavenge limited-use melee weapons, such as pipes and baseball bats, and throw bottles and bricks to distract, stun, or attack enemies. The player can upgrade weapons at workbenches using collected items. Equipment such as health kits, shivs, and Molotov cocktails can be found or crafted using collected items. Attributes such as the health meter and crafting speed can be upgraded by collecting pills and medicinal plants. Health can be recharged by finding edible items or through the use of health kits.

Though the player can attack enemies directly, they can also use stealth to attack undetected or sneak by them. "Listen Mode" allows the player to locate enemies through a heightened sense of hearing and spatial awareness, indicated as outlines visible through walls and objects. In the dynamic cover system, the player can crouch behind obstacles to gain a tactical advantage during combat. The game features periods without combat, often involving conversation between the characters. The player can solve simple puzzles, such as using floating pallets to move Ellie, who is unable to swim, across bodies of water and using ladders or dumpsters to reach higher areas. Story collectibles, such as notes, maps and comics, can be scavenged and viewed in the backpack menu.

The game features an artificial intelligence system by which hostile human enemies react to combat. If enemies discover the player, they may take cover or call for assistance, and can take advantage of the player when they are distracted, out of ammunition, or in a fight. Player companions, such as Ellie, can assist in combat by throwing objects at threats to stun them, announcing the location of unseen enemies, or using a knife and pistol to attack enemies.

Multiplayer 
The online multiplayer mode, called Factions, allows up to eight players to engage in competitive gameplay in rearranged versions of multiple single-player settings. The game features three multiplayer game types: Supply Raid and Survivors are both team deathmatches, with the latter excluding the ability to respawn; Interrogation features teams investigating the location of the enemy team's lockbox, and the first to capture said lockbox wins. In every mode, players select a faction—Hunters (a group of hostile survivors) or Fireflies (a revolutionary militia group)—and keep their clan alive by collecting supplies during matches. Each match is equal to one day; by surviving twelve "weeks", players have completed a journey and can re-select their Faction.

Players earn "parts" by marking or killing enemies, healing or reviving allies, crafting items, and unlocking the enemy lockbox. Parts can be spent mid-match on weapon upgrades and armor, and are converted to supplies at the end of the match; additional supplies can be scavenged from enemies' bodies. Players also earn points as they play, which can be spent on weapons or skills to create custom loadouts. Players could originally connect the game to their Facebook account, altering clan members' names and faces to match their Facebook friends. Players have the ability to customize their characters with hats, helmets, masks, and emblems. The multiplayer servers for the PlayStation 3 version of the game were shut down on September 3, 2019.

Plot 

In 2013, an outbreak of a mutant Cordyceps fungus ravages the United States, transforming its human hosts into aggressive creatures known as the "infected". In the suburbs of Austin, Texas, Joel (Troy Baker) flees the chaos with his brother, Tommy (Jeffrey Pierce), and daughter, Sarah (Hana Hayes). As they flee, Sarah is shot by a soldier and dies in Joel's arms.

Twenty years later, civilization has been decimated by the infection. Survivors live in totalitarian quarantine zones, independent settlements, and nomadic groups, leaving buildings and houses deserted. Joel works as a smuggler with his partner, Tess (Annie Wersching), in the quarantine zone in the North End of Boston, Massachusetts. They hunt down Robert (Robin Atkin Downes), a black-market dealer, to recover a stolen weapons cache. Before Tess kills him, Robert reveals that he traded the cache with the Fireflies, a rebel militia opposing the quarantine zone authorities.

The leader of the Fireflies, Marlene (Merle Dandridge), promises to double their cache in return for smuggling a teenage girl, Ellie (Ashley Johnson), to Fireflies hiding in the Massachusetts State House outside the quarantine zone. Joel, Tess, and Ellie sneak out in the night, but after an encounter with a government patrol, they discover Ellie is infected. Symptoms normally occur within two days, but Ellie claims she was infected three weeks earlier and that her immunity may lead to a cure. The trio makes their way to their destination through hordes of the infected but finds that the Fireflies there have been killed. Tess reveals she has been bitten by an infected and believing in Ellie's importance, sacrifices herself against pursuing soldiers so Joel and Ellie can escape. Joel decides to find Tommy, a former Firefly, in the hope that he can locate the remaining Fireflies.

With the help of Bill (W. Earl Brown), a smuggler and survivalist who owes Joel a favor, Joel and Ellie acquire a working vehicle from Bill's neighborhood in Lincoln. Driving into Pittsburgh, Pennsylvania, Joel and Ellie are ambushed by bandits, and their car is wrecked. They ally with two brothers, Henry (Brandon Scott) and Sam (Nadji Jeter). After they escape the city, Sam is bitten but hides it from the group. As his infection takes hold, Sam attacks Ellie, but Henry shoots him dead before taking his own life.

In the fall, Joel and Ellie find Tommy in Jackson, Wyoming, where he has assembled a fortified settlement near a hydroelectric dam with his wife, Maria (Ashley Scott). Joel decides to leave Ellie with Tommy, but after she confronts him about Sarah, he lets her stay with him. Tommy directs them to a Firefly enclave at the University of Eastern Colorado. They find the university abandoned but learn that the Fireflies have moved to a hospital in Salt Lake City, Utah. The two are attacked by bandits, and Joel is severely wounded while escaping.

During the winter, Ellie and Joel shelter in the mountains. Joel is on the brink of death and relies on Ellie to care for him. Hunting for food, Ellie encounters David (Nolan North) and James (Reuben Langdon), scavengers willing to trade medicine for food. After David reveals that the university bandits were part of his group, Ellie becomes hostile. She leads David's group away from Joel but is captured; David intends to recruit her into his cannibal group. Ellie escapes after killing James, but David corners her in a burning restaurant. Meanwhile, Joel recovers from his wounds and sets out to find Ellie. He reaches her just as she kills David with a machete, an act that traumatizes her, and Joel comforts her before they flee.

In the spring, Joel and Ellie arrive in Salt Lake City. Ellie is rendered unconscious after almost drowning before they are captured by a Firefly patrol. In the hospital, Marlene tells Joel that Ellie is being prepared for surgery: in hopes of producing a vaccine for the infection, the Fireflies must remove the infected portion of Ellie's brain, which will kill her. Unwilling to let Ellie die, Joel battles his way to the operating room, kills the lead surgeon, and carries the unconscious Ellie to the parking garage. He is confronted by Marlene, whom he shoots and kills to prevent the Fireflies from pursuing them. On the drive out of the city, when Ellie wakes up, Joel lies and tells her that the Fireflies had found many other immune people but were unable to create a cure and have stopped trying. On the outskirts of Tommy's settlement, Ellie expresses her survivor guilt. At her insistence, Joel swears his story about the Fireflies is true.

Development 

Naughty Dog began developing The Last of Us in 2009, following the release of Uncharted 2: Among Thieves. For the first time in the company's history, Naughty Dog split into two teams; while one team developed Uncharted 3: Drake's Deception (2011), the other began work on The Last of Us. Game director Bruce Straley and creative director Neil Druckmann led the team responsible for developing The Last of Us.

While at university, Druckmann had an idea to merge the gameplay of Ico (2001) in a story set during a zombie apocalypse, like that of George A. Romero's Night of the Living Dead (1968), with a lead character similar to John Hartigan from Sin City (1991–2000). The lead character, a police officer, would be tasked with protecting a young girl; however, due to the lead character's heart condition, players would often assume control of the young girl, reversing the roles. Druckmann later developed it when creating the story of The Last of Us. Druckmann views The Last of Us as a coming-of-age story, in which Ellie adapts to survival after spending time with Joel, as well as an exploration of how willing a father is to save his child.

A major motif of the game is that "life goes on"; this is presented in a scene in which Joel and Ellie discover a herd of giraffes, which concept artist John Sweeney explained was designed to "reignite [Ellie's] lust for life" after her suffering following her encounter with David. The infected, a core concept of the game, were inspired by a segment of the BBC nature documentary Planet Earth (2006), which featured the Cordyceps fungi. Though the fungi mainly infect insects, taking control of their motor functions and forcing them to help cultivate the fungus, the game explores the concept of the fungus evolving and infecting humans, as well as the direct results of an outbreak of this infection.

The relationship between Joel and Ellie was the focus of the game; all other elements were developed around it. Troy Baker and Ashley Johnson were cast as Joel and Ellie, respectively, and provided voice and motion capture performances. Baker and Johnson contributed to the development of the characters; for example, Baker convinced Druckmann that Joel would care for Tess due to his loneliness, and Johnson convinced Druckmann that Ellie should be stronger and more defensive. Following comparisons to actor Elliot Page, Ellie's appearance was redesigned to better reflect Johnson's personality and make her younger. The game's other characters also underwent changes. The character Tess was originally intended to be the main antagonist, but the team found it difficult to believe her motives. The sexuality of the character Bill was originally left vague in the script but later altered to further reflect his homosexuality.

The Last of Us features an original score composed primarily by Gustavo Santaolalla, along with compositions by Andrew Buresh, Anthony Caruso, and Jonathan Mayer. Known for his minimalist compositions, Santaolalla was contacted early in development. He used various instruments to compose the score, including some that he was unfamiliar with, giving a sense of danger and innocence. This minimalist approach was also taken with the game's sound and art design. The sound of the infected was one of the first tasks during development; the team experimented with the sound in order to achieve the best work possible. To achieve the sound of the Clicker, they hired voice actress Misty Lee, who provided a sound that audio lead Phillip Kovats described as originating in the "back of the throat". The art department took various pieces of work as inspiration, such as Robert Polidori's photographs following Hurricane Katrina, which were used as a reference point when designing the flooded areas of Pittsburgh. The art department were forced to negotiate for things that they wished to include, due to the strong differing opinions of the team during development. Ultimately, the team settled on a balance between simplicity and detail; while Straley and Druckmann preferred the former, the art team preferred the latter. The game's opening credits were produced by Sony's San Diego Studio.

The Last of Us game designer Ricky Cambier cited the video games Ico and Resident Evil 4 as influences on the game design. He said the emotional weight of the relationship needed to be balanced with the tension of the world's issues, stating that they "wanted to take the character building and interaction" of Ico and "blend it with the tension and action of Resident Evil 4." The team created new engines to satisfy their needs for the game. The artificial intelligence was created to coordinate with players; the addition of Ellie as artificial intelligence was a major contributor to the engine. The lighting engine was also re-created to incorporate soft light, in which the sunlight seeps in through spaces and reflects off surfaces. The gameplay introduced difficulty to the team, as they felt that every mechanic required thorough analysis. The game's user interface design also underwent various iterations throughout development.

The Last of Us was announced on December 10, 2011, at the Spike Video Game Awards, alongside its debut trailer. The announcement ignited widespread anticipation within the gaming industry, which journalists ascribed to Naughty Dog's reputation. The game missed its original projected release date of May 7, 2013, and was pushed to June 14, 2013, worldwide for further polishing. To promote pre-order sales, Naughty Dog collaborated with several retailers to provide special editions of the game with extra content.

Additional content 
Downloadable content (DLC) for the game was released following its launch. The game's Season Pass includes access to all DLC, as well as some additional abilities, and the documentary Grounded: Making The Last of Us; the documentary was released online in February 2014. Two DLC packs were included with some of the game's special editions and were available upon release. The Sights and Sounds Pack included the soundtrack, a dynamic theme for the PlayStation 3 home screen, and two avatars. The Survival Pack featured bonus skins for the player following the completion of the campaign, and in-game money, as well as bonus experience points and early access to customizable items for the game's multiplayer. Abandoned Territories Map Pack, released on October 15, 2013, added four new multiplayer maps, based on locations in the game's story. Nightmare Bundle, released on November 5, 2013, added a collection of ten head items, nine of which are available to purchase separately.

The Last of Us: Left Behind adds a single-player campaign that features two storylines—one set after the prologue of The Last of Us and one before the Winter chapter—following Ellie and her friend Riley. It was released on February 14, 2014, as DLC and on May 12, 2015, as a standalone expansion pack. A third bundle was released on May 6, 2014, featuring five separate DLC: Grounded added a new difficulty to the main game and Left Behind; Reclaimed Territories Map Pack added new multiplayer maps; Professional Survival Skills Bundle and Situational Survival Skills Bundle added eight new multiplayer skills; and Survivalist Weapon Bundle added four new weapons. The Grit and Gear Bundle, which added new headgear items, masks and gestures, was released on August 5, 2014. A Game of the Year Edition containing all downloadable content was released in Europe on November 11, 2014.

Remaster and remake 
On April 9, 2014, Sony announced The Last of Us Remastered, a remastered version of the game for the PlayStation 4. It was released in July and August 2014. Remastered uses the DualShock 4's touchpad to navigate inventory items, and the light bar signals health, scaling from green to orange and red when taking damage. In addition, audio recordings found in the game world can be heard through the controller's speaker; the original version forced players to remain in a menu while the recordings were played. The game's Photo Mode allows players to capture images of the game by pausing gameplay and adjusting the camera freely. In the menu, players have the ability to watch all cutscenes with audio commentary featuring Druckmann, Baker, and Johnson. Remastered features improved graphics and rendering upgrades, including increased draw distance, a higher frame rate, and advanced audio options. It includes the previously released downloadable content, including Left Behind and some multiplayer maps. The development team aimed to create a "true" remaster, maintaining the "core experience".

The Last of Us Part I, a remake of The Last of Us, was released for PlayStation 5 on September 2, 2022, and is scheduled for release on Windows on March 28, 2023. It features revised gameplay and controls, improved performance and lighting effects, and new accessibility options. On PlayStation 5, the game supports 3D audio, as well as the haptic feedback and adaptive triggers of the DualSense controller. Development of The Last of Us Part I was led by game director Matthew Gallant and creative director Shaun Escayg. The game was completely rebuilt to take advantage of the updated PlayStation 5 hardware, requiring new art direction, animation, and character models. The technological and graphical enhancements were intended to align with the vision of the original game's development team. Escayg wanted each element to make the player feel grounded and immersed in the game world. Gallant collaborated with a specialized team at Descriptive Video Works to create audio descriptions for cutscenes. The vision for the original game was to emphasize the beauty of the world, as opposed to a visually dark and dystopian image. Reactions to the remake's announcement were mixed, with some journalists and players considering it unnecessary due to the age of the original and the existence of The Last of Us Remastered, as well as questioning its  price point. Upon release, the game received positive reviews, with praise for its graphical enhancements, updated facial animations, improved enemy and character AI, and added accessibility, audio, and controller options, though the response to its gameplay and level design was mixed.

Reception

Initial release 

The Last of Us received "universal acclaim", according to review aggregator Metacritic, based on 98 reviews. It is the fifth-highest-rated PlayStation 3 game on Metacritic. Reviewers praised the character development, story and subtext, visual and sound design, and depiction of female and LGBT characters. It is considered one of the most significant seventh-generation video games and has been included among the greatest video games of all time. Colin Moriarty of IGN called The Last of Us "a masterpiece" and "PlayStation 3's best exclusive", and Edge considered it "the most riveting, emotionally resonant story-driven epic" of the console generation. Oli Welsh of Eurogamer wrote that it is "a beacon of hope" for the survival horror genre; Andy Kelly of Computer and Video Games declared it "Naughty Dog's finest moment".

Kelly of Computer and Video Games found the story memorable, and IGNs Moriarty named it one of the game's standout features. PlayStation Official Magazine's David Meikleham wrote that the pacing contributed to the improvement of the story, stating that there is "a real sense of time elapsed and journey traveled along every step of the way", and Destructoids Jim Sterling lauded the game's suspenseful moments. Richard Mitchell of Joystiq found that the narrative improved the character relationships.

The characters—particularly the relationship between Joel and Ellie—received acclaim. Matt Helgeson of Game Informer wrote that the relationship felt identifiable, naming it "poignant" and "well drawn". Eurogamers Welsh wrote that the characters were developed with "real patience and skill", appreciating their emotional value, and Joystiq Mitchell found the relationship "genuine" and emotional. PlayStation Official Magazines Meikleham named Joel and Ellie the best characters of any PlayStation 3 game, while IGNs Moriarty identified it as a highlight of the game. Kelly of Computer and Video Games named the characters "richly painted", feeling invested in their stories. Philip Kollar of Polygon felt that Ellie was believable, making it easier to develop a connection to her, and that the relationship between the characters was assisted by the game's optional conversations. The performances also received praise, with Edge and Eurogamers Welsh noting that the script improved as a result.

Many reviewers found the game's combat a refreshing difference from other games. Game Informers Helgeson appreciated the vulnerability during fights, while Kelly of Computer and Video Games enjoyed the variety in approaching the combat. IGNs Moriarty felt that the crafting system assisted the combat, and that the latter contributed to the narrative's emotional value, adding that enemies feel "human". Joystiqs Mitchell reiterated similar comments, stating that the combat "piles death upon death on Joel's hands". Welsh of Eurogamer found the suspenseful and threatening encounters added positively to the gameplay. Tom Mc Shea of GameSpot wrote that the artificial intelligence negatively affected the combat, with enemies often ignoring players' companions. Polygons Kollar also felt that the combat was unfair, especially when fighting the infected, and noted some inconsistencies in the game's artificial intelligence that "shatters the atmosphere" of the characters.

The game's visual features were commended by many reviewers. The art design was lauded as "outstanding" by Computer and Video Games Kelly, and "jaw-dropping" by Eurogamers Welsh. In contrast, Mc Shea of GameSpot identified the visual representation of the post-apocalyptic world was "mundane", having been portrayed various times previously. The game's graphics have been frequently named by critics as the best for a PlayStation 3 game, with Helgeson of Game Informer naming them "unmatched in console gaming" and Moriarty of IGN stating that they contribute to the realism. Destructoids Sterling wrote that the game was visually impressive but that technical issues, such as some "muddy and basic" textures found early in the game, left a negative impact on the visuals.

The world and environments of the game drew acclaim from many reviewers. Kelly of Computer and Video Games stated that the environments are "large, detailed, and littered with secrets", adding that The Last of Us "masks" its linearity successfully. Edge repeated similar remarks, writing that the level design serves the story appropriately. Helgeson of Game Informer wrote that the world "effectively and gorgeously [conveys] the loneliness" of the story. IGNs Moriarty appreciated the added design elements placed around the game world, such as the hidden notes and letters. The plausibility of the infection was commended by Scientific Americans Kyle Hill.

Reviewers praised the use of sound in The Last of Us. Eurogamers Welsh felt that the sound design was significantly better than in other games, while Game Informers Helgeson dubbed it "amazing". Mc Shea of GameSpot stated that the audio added to the effect of the gameplay, particularly when hiding from enemies. Kelly of Computer and Video Games found that the environmental audio positively impacted gameplay, and that Gustavo Santaolalla's score was "sparse and delicate". Both Game Informers Helgeson and Destructoid Sterling called the score "haunting", with the latter finding that it complements the gameplay.

The graphic depiction of violence in The Last of Us generated substantial commentary from critics. Engadget writer Ben Gilbert found the game's persistent focus on combat was "a necessary evil to lead the game's fragile protagonist duo to safety", as opposed to being used as a method to achieve objectives. Kotakus Kirk Hamilton wrote that the violence was "heavy, consequential and necessary", as opposed to gratuitous. USgamers Anthony John Agnello wrote that the game consistently reinforces the negativity associated with violence, intentionally making players feel uncomfortable while in violent combat. He stated that the deaths within the game were not unnecessary or unjustified, making the story more powerful. Kelly of Computer and Video Games stated that, despite the "incredibly brutal" combat, the violence never felt gratuitous. Eurogamers Welsh echoed similar remarks, stating that the violence is not "desensitized or mindless". Matt Helgeson of Game Informer observed that the game's violence leads to players questioning the morality of their choices. Joystiqs Mitchell wrote that the violence is "designed to be uncomfortable", stating that it contributes to Joel's character. Prior to the release of the game, Keith Stuart of The Guardian wrote that the acceptability of the violence would depend on its context within the game.

Many critics discussed the game's depiction of female characters. Jason Killingsworth of Edge praised its lack of sexualized female characters, writing that it "offers a refreshing antidote to the sexism and regressive gender attitudes of most blockbuster videogames". Eurogamers Ellie Gibson praised Ellie as "sometimes strong, sometimes vulnerable, but never a cliché". She felt that Ellie is initially established as a "damsel in distress", but that this concept is subverted. GameSpots Carolyn Petit praised the female characters as morally conflicted and sympathetic, but wrote that gender in video games should be evaluated "based on their actual merits, not in relation to other games". Chris Suellentrop of The New York Times acknowledged that Ellie is a likable and "sometimes powerful" character, but argued that The Last of Us is "actually the story of Joel", stating that it is "another video game by men, for men and about men". The Last of Us was also praised for its depiction of LGBT characters. Sam Einhorn of GayGamer.net felt that the revelation of Bill's sexuality "added to his character ... without really tokenizing him". American organization GLAAD named Bill one of the "most intriguing new LGBT characters of 2013", calling him "deeply flawed but wholly unique". A kiss between two female characters in Left Behind was met with positive reactions.

Remastered 

Like the original version, The Last of Us Remastered received "universal acclaim" according to Metacritic, based on 69 critics. It is the third-highest-rated PlayStation 4 game on Metacritic, tied with Persona 5 Royal and behind Grand Theft Auto V and Red Dead Redemption 2.

The game's enhanced graphics received positive reactions. Colin Moriarty of IGN felt that the graphical fidelity of Remastered was an improvement over The Last of Us, despite the latter being "the most beautiful game [he'd] seen on any console". GamesRadars David Houghton echoed this statement, calling the visuals "jaw-dropping". VideoGamer.com reiterated the graphical improvement over the original game, particularly praising the increased draw distance and improved lighting technology. Liam Martin of Digital Spy also felt that the lighting system improves the gameplay and makes the game "feel even more dangerous". Game Informers Tim Turi stated that the game is "even more breathtaking" than The Last of Us. Matt Swider of TechRadar appreciated the minor detail changes and the technical improvements. The Independents Jack Fleming felt that the original game's visual flaws were enhanced in Remastered but greatly complimented the updated graphics regardless.

Many reviewers considered the technical enhancements, such as the increased frame rate, a welcome advancement from the original game. Turi of Game Informer felt that the frame rate "dramatically elevate[s]" the game above the original. Jim Sterling of The Escapist complimented the upgraded frame rate, commenting that the original frame rate is a "noticeably inferior experience". IGNs Moriarty stated that, though the change was initially "jarring", he appreciated it through further gameplay. Tom Hoggins of the Telegraph echoed these statements, feeling as though the increased frame rate heightened the intensity of the gameplay. Philip Kollar of Polygon appreciated the game's improved textures and loading times.

The addition of Photo Mode was well received. TechRadars Swider named the mode as a standout feature, while IGNs Moriarty complimented the availability to capture "gorgeous" images using the feature. The adjustment of the controls received praise, with Moriarty of IGN particularly approving of the DualShock 4's triggers. Swider of TechRadar felt that the additional controls result in a better functioning game, while Digital Spy's Martin felt that it improves the game's combat, commenting that it "increase[s] this sense of immersion". Reviewers also appreciated the inclusion of the DLC and the audio commentary. These features led The Escapists Sterling to dub Remastered as "the definitive version of the game".

Accolades 

Prior to its release, The Last of Us received numerous awards for its previews at E3. It was review aggregators Metacritic and GameRankings' second-highest rated for the year 2013, behind Grand Theft Auto V. The game appeared on several year-end lists of the best games of 2013, receiving wins at the 41st Annie Awards, 10th British Academy Video Games Awards, 17th Annual D.I.C.E. Awards, and 14th Annual Game Developers Choice Awards, and from outlets such as The A.V. Club, Canada.com, The Daily Telegraph, Destructoid, The Escapist, GamesRadar, GameTrailers, GameRevolution, Giant Bomb, Good Game, Hardcore Gamer, IGN, IGN Australia, International Business Times, Kotaku, VG247, and VideoGamer.com. It was also named the Best PlayStation Game by GameSpot, GameTrailers, Hardcore Gamer, and IGN. Naughty Dog won Studio of the Year and Best Developer from The Daily Telegraph, Edge, the Golden Joystick Awards, Hardcore Gamer, and the 2013 Spike VGX.

Baker and Johnson received multiple nominations for their performances; Baker won awards from Hardcore Gamer and the 2013 Spike VGX, while Johnson won awards at the British Academy Video Games Awards, DICE Awards, VGX 2013, and from The Daily Telegraph. The game's story also received awards at the British Academy Video Games Awards, the DICE Awards, the Game Developers Choice Awards, the Golden Joystick Awards, and the Writers Guild of America Awards, and from GameTrailers, Giant Bomb, Hardcore Gamer, and IGN. The sound design and music received awards at the DICE Awards, the Inside Gaming Awards, and from IGN. The game's graphical and artistic design also won awards from Destructoid, the DICE Awards, the Golden Joystick Awards, and IGN.

The Last of Us was awarded Outstanding Innovation in Gaming at the DICE Awards, and Best Third Person Shooter from GameTrailers. The game received Best New IP from Hardcore Gamer, Best Newcomer at the Golden Joystick Awards, and Best Debut from Giant Bomb. It received Best Overall Sound, Best PlayStation 3 Multiplayer, and Best Action-Adventure Game on PlayStation 3 and overall at IGNs Best of 2013 Awards. It also won Best Action-Adventure Game at the British Academy Video Games Awards, and The Escapist, as well as Best Action Game from Hardcore Gamer and Adventure Game of the Year at the DICE Awards. The game was nominated for Best Remaster at The Game Awards 2014, and received an honorable mention for Best Technology at the 15th Annual Game Developers Choice Awards. The game was named among the best games of the 2010s by The Hollywood Reporter, Mashable, Metacritic, and VG247.

Sales 
Within seven days of its release, The Last of Us sold over 1.3 million units, becoming the biggest video game launch of 2013 at the time. Three weeks after its release, the game sold over 3.4 million units, and was deemed the biggest launch of an original game since 2011's L.A. Noire and the fastest-selling PlayStation 3 game of 2013 at the time. The game became the best-selling digital release on the PlayStation Store for PlayStation 3; this record was later beaten by Grand Theft Auto V. The Last of Us ultimately became the tenth-best-selling game of 2013. In the United Kingdom, the game remained atop the charts for six consecutive weeks, matching records set by multi-platform games. Within 48 hours of its release, The Last of Us generated more than the £3 million earned by Man of Steel in the same period. The game also topped the charts in the United States, France, Ireland, Italy, the Netherlands, Sweden, Finland, Norway, Denmark, Spain, and Japan.

The Last of Us is one of the best-selling PlayStation 3 games, and Remastered is among the best-selling PlayStation 4 games. By August 2014, the game had sold eight million copies: seven million on PlayStation 3 and one million on PlayStation 4. By April 2018, the game sold 17 million copies across both consoles. According to Niko Partners analyst Daniel Ahmad, the game had sold over  units by October 2019.

Legacy 

The Last of Us spawned a media franchise. A four-issue comic book miniseries, The Last of Us: American Dreams, was published by Dark Horse Comics from April to July 2013, written by Druckmann and illustrated by Faith Erin Hicks. The game's cast performed a live reading of selected scenes in Santa Monica, California, in July 2014, with live music by Santaolalla. A sequel, The Last of Us Part II, was released for PlayStation 4 in June 2020. Two tabletop games are in development: The Last of Us: Escape the Dark by Themeborne, due in December 2023; and The Last of Us: The Board Game by CMON, focusing on exploration, narrative, and survival elements. Two film adaptations of The Last of Us were attempted: a feature film written by Druckmann and produced by Sam Raimi entered development hell, and an animated short film adaptation by Oddfellows was canceled by Sony. Druckmann and Craig Mazin created a television adaptation of the game starring Pedro Pascal and Bella Ramsey, which debuted on HBO and HBO Max in January 2023.

Notes

References

External links 

 
 
 

The Last of Us
2010s horror video games
2013 video games
Action-adventure games
AIAS Game of the Year winners
Annie Award for Best Animated Video Game winners
British Academy Games Award for Best Game winners
D.I.C.E. Award for Adventure Game of the Year winners
Fictional fungi
Game Developers Choice Award for Game of the Year winners
LGBT-related video games
Multiplayer and single-player video games
Naughty Dog games
PlayStation 3 games
PlayStation 4 games
PlayStation 4 Pro enhanced games
Post-apocalyptic video games
Sony Interactive Entertainment games
Spike Video Game Award winners
Stealth video games
Survival video games
Third-person shooters
Video games about cannibalism
Video games about viral outbreaks
Video games about zombies
Video games adapted into comics
Video games adapted into television shows
Video games developed in the United States
Video games featuring female protagonists
Video games scored by Gustavo Santaolalla
Video games set in 2013
Video games set in Boston
Video games set in Colorado
Video games set in Massachusetts
Video games set in Pennsylvania
Video games set in Pittsburgh
Video games set in Texas
Video games set in the 2030s
Video games set in Utah
Video games set in Wyoming
Video games using Havok
Video games with downloadable content
Video games with expansion packs
Video games written by Neil Druckmann